The Soviet First League in football was the second highest division of Soviet football, below the Soviet Top League. 

While the second tier competitions in football among "teams of masters" (an official term for the Soviet professional clubs) existed since 1936, the First League has been officially formed in 1971 out of the Class A First Group. It followed the transitional 1970 season when the Class A was expanded to three groups (Vysshaya Gruppa, Pervaya Gruppa, Vtoraya Gruppa) and discontinuation of the Class B competitions for the 1971 season.

The league existed until the dissolution of the USSR in 1991.

Overview
The second tier competitions and predecessors of the First League has been known as Group B, Group 2, Class B, and Class A, group 2. The number of teams playing at this level fluctuated significantly during the history of Soviet football. In 1940s-1970s the league frequently consisted of several groups. The group winners qualified for the final tournament.

The second tier competitions among "teams of masters" existed since 1936 as part of four groups of eight All-Union competitions where each group represented a tier with Group A representing top tier, Group B representing second tier, Group V representing third tier and so on. Before the World War II the season competitions were inconsistent in every group.

Since after the World War II there existed only top two tiers for football competitions among "teams of masters". The top tier was called Pervaya Gruppa (First Group) and the second tier Vtoraya Gruppa (Second Group). In 1950 those tiers were renamed with the second tier competitions being renamed into the Class B (the top tier became the Class A). 

In 1960 Class B competitions were transformed into regional competitions with separate competitions for Russia, Ukraine, and other republics. More transformations took place in 1963 when the second tier competitions were included in the Class A competitions, while the Class B competitions were shifted to the third tier for 1964 season, thus reviving the third level competitions. Following the 1963 reform, the second tier competitions became the Vtoraya Gruppa Classa A (Class A second group) and the top tier being renamed as the Pervaya Gruppa Classa A (Class A first group). The Vtoraya Gruppa did not have multi groups competition with only one group round robin tournament.

After the 1970-1971 reforms there was established the Soviet First League with a single group competition. The league became more consisted with number of teams in league and relegation/promotion rules.

 1936-1940 Gruppa B (no competition in 1938)
 1945-1949 Vtoraya Gruppa
 1950-1962 Class B
 1963-1969 Vtoraya Gruppa (Class A)
 1970-1970 Pervaya Gruppa (Class A)
 1971-1991 Pervaya Liga

One unusual feature of the league was one that have taken place before 1989. The Soviet Football Union tried to eliminate the growing amount of drawn games, thus, intensify the competition. The participated clubs were receiving a point for each drawn game, but the amount of all their drawn games could not exceed a third of all their games played. After that they received no points for any further draws that they earned. In 1987, for example, FC Fakel Voronezh was relegated by being short of a point having received no points for their two extra drawn games.

Laureates of the Soviet second tier competitions
The teams that either won its group or participated in play-offs are included as well. All seasons are double-round robin unless otherwise indicated in "Notes".

Gruppa B (Group B)

Vtoraya Gruppa (Second Group)

Class B

Vtoraya Gruppa Klassa A (Second Group of the Class A)

Pervaya Gruppa Klassa A (First Group of the Class A)

Pervaya Liga (First League)

Winners

Podium sweep
 Russia (1963)
 Ukraine (1980)

All-time table (top 20)
There were over 260 teams that played in the Soviet First League. In the list with green background are clubs with over 30 seasons in the league.

1Three points for a win. In 1973, a point for a draw was awarded only to a team that won the subsequent penalty shootout. In 1978–1988, the number of draws for which points were awarded was limited.

Soviet football championship among reserves

Notes

References

Further reading
 Evgeni Kazakov. The Soviet First Football League (Первая лига СССР по футболу). History of Soviet football championships. Volume 1 (1936–1969). Litres, 2019.

External links

 Compilation of all game reports for the Soviet second tier. FC Dynamo Moscow website.

 
2
Defunct second level football leagues in Europe
Sports leagues established in 1970
Sports leagues disestablished in 1991
1970 establishments in the Soviet Union
1991 disestablishments in the Soviet Union